Henry John Temple, 3rd Viscount Palmerston,  (20 October 1784 – 18 October 1865) was a British statesman who was twice Prime Minister of the United Kingdom in the mid-19th century. Palmerston dominated British foreign policy during the period 1830 to 1865, when Britain stood at the height of its imperial power. He held office almost continuously from 1807 until his death in 1865. He began his parliamentary career as a Tory, defected to the Whigs in 1830, and became the first prime minister from the newly formed Liberal Party in 1859. He was highly popular with the British public. David Brown argues that "an important part of Palmerston's appeal lay in his dynamism and vigour".

Henry Temple succeeded to his father's Irish peerage (which did not entitle him to a seat in the House of Lords, leaving him eligible to sit in the House of Commons) as the 3rd Viscount Palmerston in 1802. He became a Tory MP in 1807. From 1809 to 1828 he served as Secretary at War, organising the finances of the army. He first attained Cabinet rank in 1827, when George Canning became prime minister, but like other Canningites, he resigned from office one year later. He served as foreign secretary 1830–1834, 1835–1841, and 1846–1851. In this office, Palmerston responded effectively to a series of conflicts in Europe.

In 1852 Aberdeen formed a coalition government. The Peelites insisted that Lord John Russell be foreign secretary, forcing Palmerston to take the office of home secretary. As home secretary Palmerston enacted various social reforms, although he opposed electoral reform. When Aberdeen's coalition fell in 1855 over its handling of the Crimean War, Palmerston was the only man able to sustain a majority in Parliament, and he became prime minister. He had two periods in office, 1855–1858 and 1859–1865, before his death at the age of 80 years, a few months after victory in a general election in which he had obtained an increased majority. He remains the most recent British prime minister to die in office.

Palmerston masterfully controlled public opinion by stimulating British nationalism. Although Queen Victoria and most of the political leadership distrusted him, he received and sustained the favour of the press and the populace, from whom he received the affectionate sobriquet "Pam". Palmerston's alleged weaknesses included mishandling of personal relations, and continual disagreements with the Queen over the royal role in determining foreign policy.

Historians rank Palmerston as one of the greatest foreign secretaries, due to his handling of great crises, his commitment to the balance of power (which provided Britain with decisive agency in many conflicts), his analytic skills, and his commitment to British interests. His policies in relation to India, China, Italy, Belgium, and Spain had extensive long-lasting beneficial consequences for Britain. This does not mean that Palmerston is completely without controversy. Palmerston's leadership during the Opium Wars was questioned and denounced by other prominent statesmen such as William Ewart Gladstone. The consequences of the conquest of India may have, at first, seemed to benefit both Britain (in the sense of access to goods and gold) and India (by adding infrastructure and a stable justice system), but this view has been challenged by more recent scholarship. The burdens placed on India in being ruled by a distant nation, and on the British government in dealing with the anxiety of generations of officials on how to properly govern, produced a chaotic administration with minimal coherence. The consequences of his policies toward France, the Ottoman Empire, and the United States proved more ephemeral.

Early life: 1784–1806

Henry John Temple was born in his family's Westminster house to the Irish branch of the Temple family on 20 October 1784. His family derived their title from the Peerage of Ireland, although he rarely visited Ireland. His father was The 2nd Viscount Palmerston (1739–1802), an Anglo-Irish peer, and his mother was Mary (1752–1805), a daughter of Benjamin Mee, a London merchant. From 1792 to 1794, he accompanied his family on a long Continental tour. Whilst in Italy Palmerston acquired an Italian tutor, who taught him to speak and write fluent Italian. The family owned a huge country estate in the north of County Sligo in the northwest of Ireland.

He was educated at Harrow School (1795–1800). Admiral Sir Augustus Clifford, 1st Bt., was a fag to Palmerston, Viscount Althorp and Viscount Duncannon and later remembered Palmerston as by far the most merciful of the three. Temple was often engaged in school fights and fellow Old Harrovians remembered Temple as someone who stood up to bullies twice his size. Henry Temple's father took him to the House of Commons in 1799, where the young Palmerston shook hands with the prime minister, William Pitt.

Temple was then at the University of Edinburgh (1800–1803), where he learnt political economy from Dugald Stewart, a friend of the Scottish philosophers Adam Ferguson and Adam Smith. Temple later described his time at Edinburgh as producing "whatever useful knowledge and habits of mind I possess". Lord Minto wrote to the young Palmerston's parents that Henry Temple was well-mannered and charming. Stewart wrote to a friend, saying of Temple: "In point of temper and conduct he is everything his friends could wish. Indeed, I cannot say that I have ever seen a more faultless character at this time of life, or one possessed of more amiable dispositions."

Henry Temple succeeded his father to the title of Viscount Palmerston on 17 April 1802, before he had turned 18. He also inherited a vast country estate in the north of County Sligo in the west of Ireland. He later built Classiebawn Castle on this estate. Palmerston went to St John's College, Cambridge (1803–1806). As a nobleman, he was entitled to take his MA without examinations, but Palmerston wished to obtain his degree through examinations. This was declined, although he was allowed to take the separate College examinations, where he obtained first-class honours.

After war was declared on France in 1803, Palmerston joined the Volunteers mustered to oppose a French invasion, being one of the three officers in the unit for St John's College. He was also appointed Lieutenant-Colonel Commander of the Romsey Volunteers.

Early political career: 1806–1809

In February 1806, Palmerston was defeated in the election for the University of Cambridge constituency. In November he was elected for Horsham but was unseated in January 1807, when the Whig majority in the Commons voted for a petition to unseat him.

Due to the patronage of Lord Chichester and Lord Malmesbury, Lord Palmerston  was given the post of Junior Lord of the Admiralty in the ministry of the Duke of Portland. He stood again for the Cambridge seat in May but he lost by three votes after he advised his supporters to vote for the other Tory candidate in the two-member constituency so as to ensure a Tory was elected.

Palmerston entered Parliament as Tory MP for the pocket borough of Newport on the Isle of Wight in June 1807.

On 3 February 1808 he spoke in support of confidentiality in the working of diplomacy and the bombardment of Copenhagen and the capture and destruction of the Danish Navy by the Royal Navy in the Battle of Copenhagen. Denmark was neutral but Napoleon had recently agreed with the Russians in the Treaty of Tilsit to build a naval alliance against Britain, including using the Danish navy for invading Britain. Pre-empting this, the British offered Denmark the choice of temporarily handing over its navy until the war's end or the destruction of their navy. The Danes refused to comply and so Copenhagen was bombarded. Palmerston justified the attack by peroration with reference to the ambitions of Napoleon to take control of the Danish fleet:

it is defensible on the ground that the enormous power of France enables her to coerce the weaker state to become an enemy of England... It is the law of self-preservation that England appeals for the justification of her proceedings. It is admitted by the honourable gentleman and his supporters, that if Denmark had evidenced any hostility towards this country, then we should have been justified in measures of retaliation... Denmark coerced into hostility stands in the same position as Denmark voluntarily hostile, when the law of self-preservation comes into play...Does anyone believe that Buonaparte will be restrained by any considerations of justice from acting towards Denmark as he has done towards other countries? ... England, according to that law of self-preservation which is a fundamental principle of the law of nations, is justified in securing, and therefore enforcing, from Denmark a neutrality which France would by compulsion have converted into an active hostility.

In a letter to a friend on 24 December 1807, he described the late Whig MP Edmund Burke as possessing "the palm of political prophecy". This would become a metaphor for his own career in divining the course of imperial foreign policy.

Secretary at War: 1809–1828

Palmerston's speech was so successful that Spencer Perceval, who formed his government in 1809, asked him to become Chancellor of the Exchequer, then a less important office than it was to become from the mid-nineteenth century. Palmerston preferred the office of Secretary at War, charged exclusively with the financial business of the army. Without a seat in the cabinet until 1827, he remained in the latter post for 20 years.

On 1 April 1818, a retired officer on half-pay, Lieutenant David Davies, who had a grievance about his application from the War Office for a pension and was also mentally ill, shot Lord Palmerston as he walked up the stairs of the War Office. The bullet only grazed his back and the wound was slight. After learning of Davies' illness, he paid for his legal defence at the trial,and Davies was sent to Bedlam.

After the suicide of Lord Castlereagh in 1822, the Tory Cabinet of Robert Banks Jenkinson, 2nd Earl of Liverpool began to split along political lines. The more liberal wing of the Tory government made some ground, with George Canning becoming Foreign Secretary and Leader of the House of Commons, William Huskisson advocating and applying the doctrines of free trade, and Catholic emancipation emerging as an open question. Although Palmerston was not in the Cabinet, he cordially supported the measures of Canning and his friends.

Upon the retirement of Lord Liverpool in April 1827, Canning was called to be prime minister. The more conservative Tories, including Sir Robert Peel, withdrew their support, and an alliance was formed between the liberal members of the late ministry and the Whigs. The post of Chancellor of the Exchequer was offered to Palmerston, who accepted it, but this appointment was frustrated by some intrigue between King George IV and John Charles Herries. Lord Palmerston remained Secretary at War, though he gained a seat in the cabinet for the first time. The Canning administration ended after only four months on the death of the Prime Minister, and was followed by the ministry of Lord Goderich, which barely survived the year.

The Canningites remained influential, and the Duke of Wellington hastened to include Palmerston, Huskisson, Charles Grant, William Lamb, and the Earl of Dudley in the government he subsequently formed. However, a dispute between Wellington and Huskisson over the issue of parliamentary representation for Manchester and Birmingham led to the resignation of Huskisson and his allies, including Palmerston. In the spring of 1828, after more than twenty years continuously in office, Palmerston found himself in opposition.

On 26 February 1828, Palmerston delivered a speech in favour of Catholic Emancipation. He felt that it was unseemly to relieve the "imaginary grievances" of the Dissenters from the established church while at the same time "real afflictions pressed upon the Catholics" of Great Britain. Palmerston also supported the campaign to pass the Reform Bill to extend the franchise to more men in Britain. One of his biographers has stated that: "Like many Pittites, now labelled tories, he was a good whig at heart." The Roman Catholic Relief Act 1829 finally passed Parliament in 1829 when Palmerston was in the opposition. The Great Reform Act passed Parliament in 1832.

Opposition: 1828–1830

Following his move to opposition Palmerston appears to have focused closely on foreign policy. He had already urged Wellington into active interference in the Greek War of Independence, and he had made several visits to Paris, where he foresaw with great accuracy the impending overthrow of the Bourbons. On 1 June 1829 he made his first great speech on foreign affairs.
 
in September 1830, Wellington tried to induce Palmerston to re-enter the cabinet, but he refused to do so without Lord Lansdowne and Lord Grey, two notable Whigs. This can be said to be the point in 1830, when his party allegiance changed.

Foreign Secretary: 1830–1841
Palmerston entered the office of Foreign Secretary with great energy and continued to exert his influence there for twenty years; he held it from 1830 to 1834 (his apprentice years), 1835 to 1841, and 1846 to 1851. Basically, Palmerston was responsible for the whole of British foreign policy from the time of the French and Belgian Revolutions of 1830 until December 1851.  His abrasive style would earn him the nickname "Lord Pumice Stone", and his manner of dealing with foreign governments who crossed him, especially in his later years, was the original  "gunboat diplomacy".

Crises of 1830
The Revolutions of 1830 gave a jolt to the settled European system that had been created in 1814–1815. The United Kingdom of the Netherlands was rent in half by the Belgian Revolution, the Kingdom of Portugal was the scene of civil war, and the Spanish were about to place an infant princess on the throne. Poland was in arms against the Russian Empire, while the northern powers (Russia, Prussia, and Austria) formed a closer alliance that seemed to threaten the peace and liberties of Europe. Polish exiles called on Britain to intervene against Russia during the November Uprising of 1830.

Palmerston's overall policy was to safeguard British interests, maintain peace, keep the balance of power, and retain the status quo in Europe. He had no grievance against Russia and while he privately sympathised with the Polish cause, in his role as foreign minister he rejected Polish demands. With serious trouble simultaneously taking place in Belgium and Italy, and lesser issues in Greece and Portugal, he sought to de-escalate European tensions rather than aggravate them, favouring a policy of universal non-interventionism. He therefore focused chiefly on achieving a peaceful settlement of the crisis in Belgium.

Belgium
William I of the Netherlands appealed to the great powers that had placed him on the throne after the Napoleonic Wars to maintain his rights. The London Conference of 1830 was called to address this question. The British solution involved the independence of Belgium, which Palmerston believed would greatly contribute to the security of Britain, but any solution was not straightforward. On the one hand, the northern powers were anxious to defend William I; on the other, many Belgian revolutionaries, like Charles de Brouckère and Charles Rogier, supported the reunion of the Belgian provinces to France, whereas Britain favoured Dutch, not French influence, on an independent state.

The British policy which emerged was a close alliance with France, but one subject to the balance of power on the Continent, and in particular the preservation of Belgian independence. If the northern powers supported William I by force, they would encounter the resistance of France and Britain united in arms. If France sought to annex Belgium, it would forfeit the British alliance and find herself opposed by the whole of Europe. In the end the British policy prevailed. Although the continent had been close to war, peace was maintained on London's terms and Prince Leopold of Saxe-Coburg, the widower of a British princess, was placed upon the throne of Belgium. Fishman says that the London Conference was "an extraordinarily successful conference" because it "provided the institutional framework through which the leading powers of the time safeguarded the peace of Europe."

Thereafter, despite a Dutch invasion and French counter-invasion in 1831, France and Britain framed and signed a treaty settlement between Belgium and Holland, inducing the three Northern powers to accede to it as well; while in Palmerston's second period of office, as his authority grew, he was able to finally settle relations between Belgium and Holland with a treaty in 1838-9 - now asserting his (and British) independence by leaning rather more towards Holland and the Northern Powers, and against the Belgium/French axis.

France, Spain, and Portugal, 1830s
In 1833 and 1834, the youthful Queens Isabella II of Spain and Maria II of Portugal were the representatives and the hope of the constitutional parties of their countries. Their positions were under some pressure from their absolutist kinsmen, Dom Miguel of Portugal and Don Carlos of Spain, who were the closest males in the lines of succession. Palmerston conceived and executed the plan of a quadruple alliance of the constitutional states of the West to serve as a counterpoise to the northern alliance. A treaty for the pacification of the Peninsula was signed in London on 22 April 1834 and, although the struggle was somewhat prolonged in Spain, it accomplished its objective.

France had been a reluctant party to the treaty, and never executed its role in it with much zeal. Louis Philippe was accused of secretly favouring the Carlists – the supporters of Don Carlos – and he rejected direct interference in Spain. It is probable that the hesitation of the French court on this question was one of the causes of the enduring personal hostility Palmerston showed towards the French King thereafter, though that sentiment may well have arisen earlier. Although Palmerston wrote in June 1834 that Paris was "the pivot of my foreign policy", the differences between the two countries grew into a constant but sterile rivalry that brought benefit to neither.

Balkans and Near East: defending Turkey, 1830s
Palmerston was greatly interested by the diplomatic questions of Eastern Europe. During the Greek War of Independence he had energetically supported the Greek cause and backed the Treaty of Constantinople that gave Greece its independence. However, from 1830 the defence of the Ottoman Empire became one of the cardinal objects of his policy. He believed in the regeneration of Turkey, as he wrote to Bulwer (Lord Dalling): "All that we hear about the decay of the Turkish Empire, and its being a dead body or a sapless trunk, and so forth, is pure unadulterated nonsense."

His two great aims were to prevent Russia establishing itself on the Bosporus and to prevent France doing likewise on the Nile. He regarded the maintenance of the authority of the Sublime Porte as the chief barrier against both these developments.

Palmerston had long maintained a suspicious and hostile attitude towards Russia, whose autocratic government offended his liberal principles and whose ever-growing size challenged the strength of the British Empire. He was angered by the 1833 Treaty of Hünkâr İskelesi, a mutual assistance pact between Russia and the Ottomans, but was annoyed and hostile towards David Urquhart, the creator of the Vixen affair, running the Russian blockade of Circassia in the mid-1830s.

For his part, David Urquhart considered Palmerston a "mercenary of Russia" and founded the "Free Press" magazine in London, where he constantly promoted these views. The permanent author of this magazine was Karl Marx, who stated "from the time of Peter the Great until the Crimean war, there was a secret agreement between the London and St. Petersburg offices, and that Palmerston was a corrupt tool the Tsar policy"

Despite his popular reputation he was hesitant in 1831 about aiding the Sultan of Turkey, who was under threat from Muhammad Ali, the pasha of Egypt. Later, after Russian successes, in 1833 and 1835 he made proposals to afford material aid, which were overruled by the cabinet. Palmerston held that "if we can procure for it ten years of peace under the joint protection of the five Powers, and if those years are profitably employed in reorganizing the internal system of the empire, there is no reason whatever why it should not become again a respectable Power" and challenged the metaphor that an old country, such as Turkey should be in such disrepair as would be warranted by the comparison: "Half the wrong conclusions at which mankind arrive are reached by the abuse of metaphors, and by mistaking general resemblance or imaginary similarity for real identity." However, when the power of Muhammad Ali appeared to threaten the existence of the Ottoman dynasty, particularly given the death of Sultan Mahmud II on 1 July 1839, he succeeded in bringing the great powers together to sign a collective note on 27 July pledging them to maintain the independence and integrity of the Turkish Empire in order to preserve the security and peace of Europe. However, by 1840 Muhammad Ali had occupied Syria and won the Battle of Nezib against the Turkish forces. Lord Ponsonby, the British ambassador at Constantinople, vehemently urged the British government to intervene. Privately, Palmerston explained his views on Muhammad Ali to Lord Granville thus: "Coercion of Mehemet Ali by England if war broke out might appear partial and unjust; but we are partial; and the great interests of Europe require that we should be so....No ideas therefore of fairness towards Mehemet ought to stand in the way of such great and paramount interests." Having closer ties to the pasha than most, France refused to be a party to coercive measures against him despite having signed the note in the previous year.

Palmerston, irritated at France's Egyptian policy, signed the London Convention of 15 July 1840 in London with Austria, Russia, and Prussia – without the knowledge of the French government.  This measure was taken with great hesitation, and strong opposition on the part of several members of the cabinet.  Palmerston forced the measure through in part by declaring in a letter to the prime minister, Lord Melbourne, that he would resign from the ministry if his policy were not adopted.
The London Convention granted Muhammad Ali hereditary rule in Egypt in return for withdrawal from Syria and Lebanon, but was rejected by the pasha.  The European powers intervened with force, and the bombardment of Beirut, the fall of Acre, and the total collapse of Muhammad Ali's power followed in rapid succession.  Palmerston's policy was triumphant, and the author of it had won a reputation as one of the most powerful statesmen of the age.

In September 1838, Palmerston appointed a British consul in Jerusalem, without the conventional consultation of the Board of Trade, and gave instruction to assist with the construction of an Anglican church in the city, under the prompting influences of Lord Shaftesbury, a prominent Christian Zionist.

China: First Opium War

China restricted outside trade under the Canton System to only one port and refused all official diplomatic relations except to tributary countries. In 1833–1835, as London ended the East India Company's monopoly on trade with China, both Tory and Whig governments sought to maintain peace and good trade relations. However Lord Napier wanted to provoke a revolution in China that would open trade. The Foreign Office, led by Palmerston, stood opposed and sought peace. The Chinese government refused to change, and interdicted the British smugglers bringing in opium from India, which was banned in China. Britain responded with military force in the First Opium War, 1839–1842, which ended in a decisive British victory. Under the Treaty of Nanjing, China paid an indemnity and opened five treaty ports to world trade. In those ports there would be extraterritorial rights for British citizens. Palmerston thus achieved his main goals of diplomatic equality and opening China to trade. However his angry critics focused on the immorality of the opium trade.

Palmerston's biographer, Jasper Ridley, outlines the government's position:
Conflict between China and Britain was inevitable. On the one side was a corrupt, decadent and caste-ridden despotism, with no desire or ability to wage war, which relied on custom much more than force for the enforcement of extreme privilege and discrimination, and which was blinded by a deep-rooted superiority complex into believing that they could assert their supremacy over Europeans without possessing military power. On the other side was the most economically advanced nation in the world, a nation of pushing, bustling traders, of self-help, free trade, and the pugnacious qualities of John Bull.

An entirely opposite British viewpoint was promoted by humanitarians and reformers such as the Chartists and religious nonconformists led by young William Ewart Gladstone. They argued that Palmerston was only interested in the huge profits it would bring Britain, and was totally oblivious to the horrible moral evils of opium which the Chinese government was valiantly trying to stamp out.

Meanwhile, he manipulated information and public opinion to enhance his control of his department, including controlling communications within the office and to other officials. He leaked secrets to the press, published selected documents, and released letters to give himself more control and more publicity, all the while stirring up British nationalism. He feuded with The Times, edited by Thomas Barnes, which did not play along with his propaganda ploys.

Marriage

In 1839, Palmerston married his mistress of many years, the noted Whig hostess Emily Lamb, widow of Peter Leopold Louis Francis Nassau Clavering-Cowper, 5th Earl Cowper (1778–1837) and sister of William Lamb, 2nd Viscount Melbourne, prime minister (1834 and 1835–1841). They had no legitimate children, although at least one of Lord Cowper's putative children, Lady Emily Cowper, the wife of Anthony Ashley-Cooper, 7th Earl of Shaftesbury, was widely believed to have been fathered by Palmerston. Palmerston resided at Brocket Hall in Hertfordshire, his wife's inheritance. His London townhouse was Cambridge House on Piccadilly in Mayfair. He also owned Broadlands at Romsey in Hampshire.

Emily's son-in-law, Lord Shaftesbury wrote:
"His attentions to Lady Palmerston, when they both of them were well stricken in years, were those of a perpetual courtship. The sentiment was reciprocal; and I have frequently seen them go out on a morning to plant some trees, almost believing that they would live to eat the fruit, or sit together under the shade.

Young Queen Victoria found it unseemly that people in their 50s could marry, but the Cowper-Palmerston marriage according to biographer Gillian Gill:
was an inspired political alliance as well as a stab at personal happiness. Harry and Emily were supremely well-matched. As the husband of a beautiful, charming, intelligent, rich woman whose friends were the best people in society, Palmerston at last had the money, the social setting, and the personal security he needed to get to the very top of British politics. Lady Palmerston made her husband happy, as he did her, and she was a political power in her own right. In the last and most successful decades of Palmerston's life, she was his best advisor and most trusted amanuensis. Theirs was one of the great marriages of the century.

Opposition: 1841–1846
Within a few months Melbourne's administration came to an end (1841) and Palmerston remained out of office for five years. The crisis was past, but the change which took place by the substitution of François Guizot for Adolphe Thiers in France, and of Lord Aberdeen for Palmerston in Britain kept the peace.  Palmerston believed that peace with France was not to be relied on, and indeed that war between the two countries was sooner or later inevitable. Aberdeen and Guizot inaugurated a different policy: by mutual confidence and friendly offices, they entirely succeeded in restoring the most cordial understanding between the two governments, and the irritation which Palmerston had inflamed gradually subsided. During the administration of Sir Robert Peel, Palmerston led a retired life, but he attacked with characteristic bitterness the Webster-Ashburton Treaty of 1842 with the United States. It resolved several Canadian boundary disputes with the United States, particularly the border between New Brunswick and the State of Maine and between Canada and the State of Minnesota from Lake Superior and the Lake of the Woods. Much as he criticised it, the treaty successfully closed the border questions with which Palmerston had long been concerned.

Palmerston's reputation as an interventionist and his unpopularity with the Queen were such that Lord John Russell's attempt in December 1845 to form a ministry failed because Lord Grey refused to join a government in which Palmerston would direct foreign affairs. A few months later, however, the Whigs came to power and returned Palmerston to the Foreign Office (July 1846). Russell replied to critics that Palmerston's policies had "a tendency to produce war" but that he had advanced British interests without a major conflict, if not entirely peaceably.

Foreign Secretary: 1846–1851
Palmerston's years as foreign secretary, 1846–1851, involve dealing with violent upheavals all over Europe – he has been dubbed "the gunpowder minister" by biographer David Brown.

France and Spain, 1845

The French government regarded the appointment of Palmerston as a certain sign of renewed hostilities. They availed themselves of a dispatch in which he had put forward the name of a Coburg prince as a candidate for the hand of the young queen of Spain as a justification for a departure from the engagements entered into between Guizot and Lord Aberdeen. However little the conduct of the French government in this transaction of the Spanish marriages can be vindicated, it is certain that it originated in the belief that in Palmerston France had a restless and subtle enemy. The efforts of the British minister to defeat the French marriages of the Spanish princesses, by an appeal to the Treaty of Utrecht and the other powers of Europe, were wholly unsuccessful; France won the game, though with no small loss of honourable reputation.

Historian David Brown rejects the traditional interpretation to the effect that Aberdeen had forged an entente cordiale with France in the early 1840s whereupon the belligerent Palmerston after 1846 destroyed that friendly relationship. Brown argues that as foreign secretary from 1846 to 1851 and subsequently as prime minister, Palmerston sought to maintain the balance of power in Europe, sometimes even aligning with France to do so.

Irish Famine
As an Anglo-Irish absentee landlord, Palmerston evicted 2,000 of his Irish tenants for non-payment of rent during the Great Irish Famine that ravaged Ireland in the late 1840s. He financed the emigration of starving Irish tenants across the Atlantic to North America as did Petty-Fitzmaurice (Lord Lansdowne) to equal notoriety. Palmerston asserted that "... any great improvement in the social system of Ireland must be founded upon an extensive change in the present state of agrarian occupation [through] a long continued and systematic ejectment of Small holders and of Squatting Cottiers."

Support for revolutions abroad
The Revolutions of 1848 spread like a conflagration through Europe, and shook every throne on the Continent except those of Russian empire, Ottoman empire, Spain, and Belgium. Palmerston sympathised openly with the revolutionary party abroad. In particular, he was a strong advocate of national self-determination, and stood firmly on the side of constitutional liberties on the Continent. Despite this, he was bitterly opposed to Irish independence, and deeply hostile to the Young Ireland movement.

Italian independence
No state was regarded by him with more aversion than Austria. Yet, his opposition to Austria was chiefly based upon its occupation of northeastern Italy and its Italian policy. Palmerston maintained that the existence of Austria as a great power north of the Alps was an essential element in the system of Europe. Antipathies and sympathies had a large share in the political views of Palmerston, and his sympathies had ever been passionately awakened by the cause of Italian independence. He supported the Sicilians against the King of Naples, and even allowed arms to be sent them from the Royal Arsenal, Woolwich. Although he had endeavoured to restrain the King of Sardinia from his rash attack on the superior forces of Austria, he obtained for him a reduction of the penalty of defeat. Austria, weakened by the revolution, sent an envoy to London to request the mediation of Britain, based on a large cession of Italian territory. Palmerston rejected the terms he might have obtained for Piedmont. After a couple of years this wave of revolution was replaced by a wave of reaction.

Hungarian independence
In Hungary, the 1848 war for independence from the Austrian Empire, ruled by the Habsburg dynasty, was defeated by the joint army of Austrian and Russian forces. Prince Schwarzenberg assumed the government of the empire with dictatorial power. In spite of what Palmerston termed his judicious bottle-holding, the movement he had encouraged and applauded, but to which he could give no material aid, was everywhere subdued. The British government, or at least Palmerston as its representative, was regarded with suspicion and resentment by every power in Europe, except the French republic. Even that was shortly afterwards to be alienated by Palmerston's attack on Greece. When Lajos Kossuth, the Hungarian democrat and leader of its constitutionalists, landed in England in 1851 to wide applause, Palmerston proposed to receive him at Broadlands, a design which was only prevented by a peremptory vote of the cabinet.

Royal and parliamentary reaction to 1848
This state of things was regarded with the utmost annoyance by the British court and by most of the British ministers. On many occasions, Palmerston had taken important steps without their knowledge, which they disapproved.  Over the Foreign Office he asserted and exercised an arbitrary dominion, which the feeble efforts of the premier could not control. The Queen and the Prince Consort did not conceal their indignation at the fact that they were held responsible for Palmerston's actions by the other Courts of Europe.

When Disraeli attacked Palmerston's foreign policy, the foreign minister responded to a five-hour speech by Anstey with a five-hour speech of his own, the first of two great speeches in which he laid out a comprehensive defence of his foreign policy and of liberal interventionism more generally. Arguing for domestic political effect, Palmerston declaimed:
I hold that the real policy of England... is to be the champion of justice and right, pursuing that course with moderation and prudence, not becoming the Quixote of the world, but giving the weight of her moral sanction and support wherever she thinks that justice is, and whenever she thinks that wrong has been done.
(...)
Therefore I say that it is a narrow policy to suppose that this country or that is to be marked out as the eternal ally or the perpetual enemy of England. We have no eternal allies, and we have no perpetual enemies. Our interests are eternal and perpetual, and those interests it is our duty to follow.

Russell and the Queen both hoped that the other would take the initiative and dismiss Palmerston; the Queen was dissuaded by her husband Prince Albert, who took the limits of constitutional power very seriously, and Russell by Palmerston's prestige with the people and his competence in an otherwise remarkably inept Cabinet.

Don Pacifico affair

In 1847, the home of Don Pacifico, a Gibraltarian merchant living in Athens, Greece, was attacked by an antisemitic mob, which included the sons of a Greek government minister. The Greek police did not intervene in the attack, despite being present. Because Don Pacifico was a British subject, the British government expressed concern. In January 1850, Palmerston took advantage of Don Pacifico's claims on the Greek government, and blockaded the port of Piraeus in the kingdom of Greece. As Greece was under the joint protection of three powers, Russia and France protested against its coercion by the British fleet.

After a memorable debate on 17 June, Palmerston's policy was condemned by a vote of the House of Lords. The House of Commons was moved by Roebuck to reverse the rebuke, which it did on 29 June by a majority of 46, after having heard from Palmerston on 25 June. This was the most eloquent and powerful speech he ever delivered, wherein he sought to vindicate not only his claims on the Greek government for Don Pacifico, but his entire administration of foreign affairs.

It was in this speech, which lasted for five hours, that Palmerston made the well known declaration that a British subject ought everywhere to be protected by the strong arm of the British government against injustice and wrong; comparing the reach of the British Empire to that of the Roman Empire, in which a Roman citizen could walk the earth unmolested by any foreign power. This was the famous civis romanus sum ("I am a citizen of Rome") speech. After this speech, Palmerston's popularity had never been greater.

Crossing the Queen and resigning, 1851
Notwithstanding his parliamentary triumph in the Don Pacifico affair, many of his own colleagues and supporters criticised the spirit in which the foreign relations of the Crown were carried on. The Queen addressed a minute to the Prime Minister in which she recorded her dissatisfaction at the manner in which Palmerston evaded the obligation to submit his measures for the royal sanction as failing in sincerity to the Crown. This minute was communicated to Palmerston, who accepted its criticisms.

On 2 December 1851, Louis Napoleon – who had been elected President of France in 1848 – carried out a coup d'état by dissolving the National Assembly and arresting the leading Republicans. Palmerston privately congratulated Napoleon on his triumph, noting that Britain's constitution was rooted in history but that France had had five revolutions since 1789, with the French Constitution of 1848 being a "day-before-yesterday tomfoolery which the scatterbrain heads of Marrast and Tocqueville invented for the torment and perplexity of the French nation". However, the Cabinet decided that Britain must be neutral, and so Palmerston requested his officials to be diplomatic. Palmerston's widespread support among the press, educated public opinion, and ordinary Britons caused apprehension and distrust among other politicians and angered the Court. Prince Albert complained Palmerston had sent a dispatch without showing the Sovereign. Protesting innocence, Palmerston resigned. Palmerston was weakened because Parliament, where he had great support, was not in session. Palmerston continued to have wide approval among the newspapers, elite opinion, and the middle class voters. His popularity led to distrust among rivals and especially at the Royal Court. His fall demonstrates the lack of power of public opinion in a pre-democratic era. However, Palmerston kept his public support and the growing influence of public opinion steadily increased his political strength in the 1850s and 1860s.

Home Secretary: 1852–1855
After a brief period of Conservative minority government, the Earl of Aberdeen became Prime Minister (in office 19 December 1852 – 30 January 1855) in a coalition government of Whigs and Peelites (with Russell taking the role of Foreign Secretary and Leader of the House of Commons). It was regarded as impossible for them to form a government without Palmerston, so he was made Home Secretary (28 December 1852). Many people considered this a curious appointment because Palmerston's expertise was so obviously in foreign affairs. A story recounts that after a great wave of strikes swept Northern England, the Queen summoned Palmerston to discuss the situation. When she enquired after the latest news, Palmerston allegedly replied: "There is no definite news, Madam, but it seems certain that the Turks have crossed the Danube".

Social reform
Palmerston passed the Factory Act 1853, which removed loopholes in previous Factory Acts and outlawed all labour by young persons between 6pm and 6am. He attempted to pass a Bill that confirmed the rights of workers to combine, but the House of Lords rejected it. He introduced the Truck Act which stopped the practice of employers paying workmen in goods instead of money, or forcing them to purchase goods from shops owned by the employers. In August 1853, Palmerston introduced the Smoke Abatement Act in order to combat the increasing smoke from coal fires, a problem greatly aggravated by the Industrial Revolution. He also oversaw the passage of the Vaccination Act 1853 into law, which was introduced as a private member's bill, and which Palmerston persuaded the government to support. The Act made vaccination of children compulsory for the first time. Palmerston outlawed the burying of the dead in churches. The right to bury the dead in churches was held by wealthy families whose ancestors had purchased the right in the past. Palmerston opposed this practice on public-health grounds and ensured that all bodies were buried in a churchyard or public cemetery.

Penal reform
Palmerston reduced the period in which prisoners could be held in solitary confinement from eighteen months to nine months. He also ended transportation to Tasmania for prisoners by passing the Penal Servitude Act 1853, which also reduced the maximum sentences for most offences. Palmerston passed the Reformatory Schools Act 1854 which gave the Home Secretary powers to send juvenile prisoners to a reformatory school instead of to prison. He was forced to accept an amendment which ensured that the prisoner had to have spent at least three months in jail first. When in October 1854 Palmerston visited Parkhurst gaol and conversed with three boy inmates, he was impressed by their behaviour and ordered that they be sent to a reformatory school. He found the ventilation in the cells unsatisfactory and ordered improvement.

Palmerston strongly opposed Lord John Russell's plans for giving the vote to sections of the urban working-classes. When the Cabinet agreed in December 1853 to introduce a bill during the next session of Parliament in the form which Russell wanted, Palmerston resigned. However, Aberdeen told him that no definite decision on reform had been taken and persuaded Palmerston to return to the Cabinet.  The electoral Reform Bill did not pass Parliament that year.

Crimean War
Palmerston's exile from his traditional realm of the Foreign Office meant he did not have full control over British policy during the events precipitating the Crimean War of 1853–1856. One of his biographers, Jasper Ridley, argues that had he been in control of foreign policy at this time, war in the Crimea would have been avoided. Palmerston argued in Cabinet, after Russian troops concentrated on the Ottoman border in February 1853, that the Royal Navy should join the French fleet in the Dardanelles as a warning to Russia. He was overruled, however.

In May 1853, the Russians threatened to invade the principalities of Wallachia and Moldavia unless the Ottoman Sultan acceded to their demands. Palmerston argued for immediate decisive action - that the Royal Navy should be sent to the Dardanelles to assist the Turkish navy and that Britain should inform Russia of London's intention to go to war if the Imperial Russian Army invaded the principalities. However, Aberdeen objected to all of Palmerston's proposals. After prolonged arguments, a reluctant Aberdeen agreed to send a fleet to the Dardanelles but objected to Palmerston's other proposals. The Russian Emperor, Nicholas I, was annoyed by Britain's actions but they did not  deter him. When the British fleet arrived at the Dardanelles the weather was rough, so the fleet took refuge in the outer waters of the straits (June 1853). The Russians saw this as a violation of the Straits Convention of 1841; they invaded the two principalities in July 1853. Palmerston interpreted this as the result of British weakness and thought that if the Russians had been told that if they invaded the principalities the British and French fleets would enter the Bosphorus or the Black Sea, they would have been deterred. In Cabinet, Palmerston argued for a vigorous prosecution of the war against Russia by Britain, but Aberdeen objected, as he wanted peace. British public opinion supported the Turks, and with Aberdeen becoming steadily unpopular, Lord Dudley Stuart in February 1854 noted, "Wherever I go, I have heard but one opinion on the subject, and that one opinion has been pronounced in a single word, or in a single name – Palmerston."

On 28 March 1854, Britain and France declared war on Russia for refusing to withdraw from the principalities. The war progressed slowly, with no Anglo-French gains in the Baltic and slow coalition gains in Crimea at the long Siege of Sevastopol (1854–1855).  Dissatisfaction with the conduct of the war grew amongst the public in Britain and in other countries, aggravated by reports of fiascos and failures, especially the mismanagement of the heroic Charge of the Light Brigade at the Battle of Balaclava (25 October 1854). The health and living-conditions of the British soldiers became notorious and the press, with correspondents in the field, made the most of the situation. Tories demanded an accounting of all soldiers, cavalry and sailors sent to the Crimea and accurate figures as to the number of casualties. When Parliament passed a bill to investigate by a vote of 305 to 148, Aberdeen said he had lost a vote of no confidence and resigned as prime minister on 30 January 1855.

Queen Victoria deeply distrusted Palmerston and first asked Lord Derby to accept the premiership. Derby offered Palmerston the office of Secretary of State for War, which he accepted under the condition that Clarendon remain as Foreign Secretary. Clarendon refused, and so Palmerston rejected Derby's offer; Derby subsequently gave up trying to form a government. The Queen sent for Lansdowne but (aged 74) he was too old to accept:  so she asked Russell; but none of his former colleagues except Palmerston wanted to serve under him. Having exhausted the possible alternatives, the Queen invited Palmerston to Buckingham Palace on 4 February 1855 to form a government.

Prime Minister: 1855–1858

Aged 70 years, 109 days, Palmerston became the oldest person in British political history to be appointed Prime Minister for the first time. As of 2022 no Prime Minister entering 10 Downing Street for the first time since Palmerston has surpassed his record.

Ending the Crimean War

Palmerston took a hard line on the war; he wanted to expand the fighting, especially in the Baltic where St. Petersburg could be threatened by superior British naval power. His goal was to permanently reduce the Russian threat to Europe. Sweden and Prussia were willing to join, and Russia stood alone. However, France, which had sent far more soldiers to the war than Britain, and had suffered far more casualties, wanted the war to end, as did Austria. In March 1855 the old Tsar died and was succeeded by his son, Alexander II, who wished to make peace. However, Palmerston found the peace terms too soft on Russia and so persuaded Napoleon III of France to break off the peace negotiations until Sevastopol could be captured, putting the allies in a stronger negotiating position. In September Sevastopol finally surrendered and the allies had full control of the Black Sea theatre. Russia came to terms. On 27 February 1856 an armistice was signed and after a month's negotiations an agreement was signed at the Congress of Paris. Palmerston's demand for a demilitarised Black Sea was secured, although his wish for the Crimea to be returned to the Ottomans was not. The peace treaty was signed on 30 March 1856. In April 1856 Palmerston was appointed to the Order of the Garter by Victoria.

Arrow controversy and the Second Opium War
In October 1856, the Chinese seized the pirate ship Arrow, and in the process, according to the local British official Harry Parkes, insulted the British flag. When the Chinese Commissioner Ye Mingchen refused to apologise, the British shelled his compound. The commissioner retaliated with a proclamation that called on the people of Canton to "unite in exterminating these troublesome English villains" and offered a $100 bounty for the head of any Englishman. The British factories outside the city were also burned to the ground by incensed locals. Palmerston supported Parkes while in Parliament the British policy was strongly attacked on moral grounds by Richard Cobden and William Gladstone. Playing the patriotism card, Palmerston said that Cobden demonstrated "an anti-English feeling, an abnegation of all those ties which bind men to their country and to their fellow countrymen, which I should hardly have expected from the lips of any member of this House. Everything that was English was wrong, and everything that was hostile to England was right." He went on to say that if a motion of censure was carried it would signal that the House had voted to "abandon a large community of British subjects at the extreme end of the globe to a set of barbarians – a set of kidnapping, murdering, poisoning barbarians." The censure motion was carried by a majority of sixteen and the election of 1857 followed. Palmerston's stance proved popular among a large section of the workers, the growing middle classes and the country's commercial and financial interests. With the expanded franchise, his party swept on a wave of popular feeling to a majority of 83, the largest since 1835. Cobden and John Bright lost their seats.

In China, the Second Opium War (1856–1860) was another humiliating defeat for a Qing dynasty, already reeling as a result of the domestic Taiping Rebellion.

Resignation

After the election, Palmerston passed the Matrimonial Causes Act 1857, which for the first time made it possible for courts to grant a divorce and removed divorce from the jurisdiction of the ecclesiastical courts. The opponents in Parliament, who included Gladstone, were the first in British history to try to kill a bill by filibuster. Nonetheless, Palmerston was determined to get the bill through, which he did.  In June news came to Britain of the Indian Rebellion of 1857. Palmerston sent Sir Colin Campbell and reinforcements to India. Palmerston also agreed to transfer the authority of the East India Company to the Crown. This was enacted in the Government of India Act 1858.  After the Italian republican Felice Orsini tried to assassinate the French emperor with a bomb made in Britain, the French were outraged (see Orsini affair). Palmerston introduced a Conspiracy to Murder bill, which made it a felony to plot in Britain to murder someone abroad. At first reading, the Conservatives voted for it but at second reading they voted against it. Palmerston lost by nineteen votes. Therefore, in February 1858 he was forced to resign.

Opposition: 1858–1859
The Conservatives lacked a majority, and Russell introduced a resolution in March 1859 arguing for widening the franchise, which the Conservatives opposed but which was carried. Parliament was dissolved and a general election ensued, which the Whigs won. Palmerston rejected an offer from Disraeli to become Conservative leader, but he attended the meeting of 6 June 1859 in Willis's Rooms at St James Street, where the Liberal Party was formed. The Queen asked Lord Granville to form a government, but although Palmerston agreed to serve under him, Russell did not. Therefore, on 12 June the Queen asked Palmerston to become prime minister. Russell and Gladstone agreed to serve under him.

Prime Minister: 1859–1865

Historians usually regard Palmerston, starting in 1859, as the first Liberal prime minister. In his last premiership Palmerston oversaw the passage of important legislation. The Offences against the Person Act 1861 codified and reformed the law, and was part of a wider process of consolidating criminal law. The Companies Act 1862 was the basis of modern company law.

Foreign policy continued to be his main strength; he thought that he could shape if not control all of European diplomacy, especially by using France as a vital ally and trade partner. However, historians often characterise his method as bluffing more than decisive action.

Some people called Palmerston a womaniser; The Times named him Lord Cupid (on account of his youthful looks), and he was cited, at the age of 79, as co-respondent in an 1863 divorce case, although it emerged that the case was nothing more than an attempted blackmail.

Relationship with Gladstone
Although Palmerston and William Gladstone treated each other as gentlemen, they disagreed fundamentally over Church appointments, foreign affairs, defence and reform; Palmerston's greatest problem during his last premiership was how to handle his Chancellor of the Exchequer. The MP Sir William Gregory was told by a member of the Cabinet that "at the beginning of each session and after each holiday, Mr Gladstone used to come in charged to the muzzle with all sorts of schemes of all sorts of reforms which were absolutely necessary in his opinion to be immediately undertaken. Palmerston used to look fixedly at the paper before him, saying nothing until there was a lull in Gladstone's outpouring. He then rapped the table and said cheerfully: 'Now, my Lords and gentlemen, let us go to business'." Palmerston told Lord Shaftesbury: "Gladstone will soon have it all his own way and whenever he gets my place we shall have strange doings". He told another friend that he thought Gladstone would wreck the Liberal Party and end up in a madhouse.

When in May 1864 the MP Edward Baines introduced a Reform Bill in the Commons, Palmerston ordered Gladstone to not commit himself and the government to any particular scheme. Instead Gladstone said in his speech in the Commons that he did not see why any man should not have the vote unless he was mentally incapacitated, but added that this would not come about unless the working class showed an interest in reform. Palmerston believed that this was incitement to the working class to begin agitating for reform and told Gladstone: "What every Man and Woman too have a Right to, is to be well governed and under just Laws, and they who propose a change ought to shew that the present organization does not accomplish those objects".

French intervention in Italy had created an invasion scare and Palmerston established a Royal Commission on the Defence of the United Kingdom which reported in 1860. It recommended a huge programme of fortifications to protect the Royal Navy Dockyards and ports, which Palmerston vigorously supported. Objecting to the enormous expense, Gladstone repeatedly threatened to resign as Chancellor when the proposals were accepted. Palmerston said that he had received so many resignation letters from Gladstone that he feared that they would set fire to the chimney.

Relationship with Lord Lyons
During the advent and occurrence of the American Civil War, the British Ambassador to the United States was Palmerston's close friend and ally Richard Lyons, 2nd Baron Lyons. Palmerston had first appointed Richard Lyons to the Foreign Service in 1839, and was a close friend of his father, Edmund Lyons, 1st Baron Lyons, with whom he had vehemently advocated increased aggression in the Crimean War. Palmerston and Lyons both had similar sociopolitical sympathies: both advocated monarchy and foreign interventionism. Throughout the American Civil War, Palmerston and Richard Lyons maintained an extensive confidential correspondence. Their actions were responsible for the peaceful resolution of the Trent Affair. When Lyons resigned from the position of American Ambassador, Palmerston attempted to persuade him to return, but Lyons declined the offer.

American Civil War

Palmerston's sympathies in the American Civil War (1861–65) were with the secessionist Confederate States of America. Although a professed opponent of the slave trade and slavery, he held a lifelong hostility towards the United States, and believed a dissolution of the Union would enhance British power. Additionally, the Confederacy "would afford a valuable and extensive market for British manufactures".

Britain issued a proclamation of neutrality at the beginning of the Civil War on 13 May 1861. The Confederacy was recognised as a belligerent but it was too premature to recognise it as a sovereign state. The United States Secretary of State, William Seward, threatened to treat as hostile any country which recognised the Confederacy. Britain depended more on American corn than Confederate cotton, and a war with the U.S. would not be in Britain's economic interest. Palmerston ordered reinforcements sent to the Province of Canada because he was convinced the North would make peace with the South and then invade Canada. He was very pleased with the Confederate victory at the First Battle of Bull Run in July 1861, but 15 months later he felt: "...the American War... has manifestly ceased to have any attainable object as far as the Northerns are concerned, except to get rid of some more thousand troublesome Irish and Germans. It must be owned, however, that the Anglo-Saxon race on both sides have shown courage and endurance highly honourable to their stock."

The Trent Affair in November 1861 produced public outrage in Britain and a diplomatic crisis. A U.S. Navy warship stopped the British steamer Trent and seized two Confederate envoys en route to Europe.  Palmerston called the action "a declared and gross insult", demanded the release of the two diplomats and ordered 3,000 troops to Canada.  In a letter to Queen Victoria on 5 December 1861 he said that if his demands were not met: "Great Britain is in a better state than at any former time to inflict a severe blow upon and to read a lesson to the United States which will not soon be forgotten." In another letter to his foreign secretary, he predicted war between Britain and the Union:
"It is difficult not to come to the conclusion that the rabid hatred of England which animates the exiled Irishmen who direct almost all the Northern newspapers, will so excite the masses as to make it impossible for Lincoln and Seward to grant our demands; and we must therefore look forward to war as the probable result."
In fact, Irishmen did not control any major newspapers in the North, and the U.S. decided to release the prisoners rather than risk war. Palmerston was convinced the presence of troops in Canada persuaded the U.S. to acquiesce.

After President Abraham Lincoln's announcement in September 1862 that he would issue an Emancipation Proclamation in ninety days, the cabinet debated intervention as a humanitarian move to stop a likely race war. At the same time however there was a cabinet crisis in France over the overthrow of the Greek king and the growing Eastern Question with regard to Russia. The British Government had to determine whether the situation in North America or the containment of Russia was more urgent. The decision was to give priority to threats closer to home and to decline France's suggestion of a joint intervention in America; the threatened race war over slavery never happened. Palmerston rejected all further efforts of the Confederacy to gain British recognition.

The raiding ship CSS Alabama, built in the British port of Birkenhead, was another difficulty for Palmerston. On 29 July 1862, a law officer's report he had commissioned advised him to detain Alabama, as its construction was a breach of Britain's neutrality. Palmerston ordered Alabama detained on 31 July, but it had already put to sea before the order reached Birkenhead. In her subsequent cruise, Alabama captured or destroyed many Union merchant ships, as did other raiders fitted out in Britain.  The U.S. accused Britain of complicity in the construction of the raiders.  This was the basis of the postwar Alabama claims for damages against Britain, which Palmerston refused to pay.  After his death, Gladstone acknowledged the U.S. claim and agreed to arbitration, paying out $15,500,000 in damages.

Denmark
The Prussian Prime Minister Otto von Bismarck wanted to annex the Danish duchy of Schleswig and the neighboring German duchy of Holstein, whose Duke was the King of Denmark, chiefly for its port of Kiel, and had an alliance with Austria for this purpose. In a speech to the Commons on 23 July 1863, Palmerston said the British government, like those of France and Russia, wished that "the independence, the integrity, and the rights of Denmark may be maintained. We are convinced—I am convinced at least—that if any violent attempt were made to overthrow those rights and interfere with that independence, those who made the attempt would find in the result that it would not be Denmark alone with which they would have to contend". Palmerston's stance derived from the traditional belief that France was the greater threat to Britain and was much stronger than Austria and Prussia.   In any case, France and Britain were at odds over Poland, and Paris refused to cooperate with London on the Danish crisis. Public opinion in Britain was strongly pro-Danish, thanks especially to the Danish princess who married the Prince of Wales. However Queen Victoria was intensely pro-German and strongly urged against threatening war. Palmerston himself favoured Denmark but he also had long been pacifistic in this matter and did not want Britain to become militarily involved.

For five months Bismarck did nothing. However, in November the Danish government instituted a new constitution whereby Schleswig was bound closer to Denmark. By the year's end, the Prussian and Austrian armies had occupied Holstein and were massing on the River Eider, the border with Schleswig. On 1 February 1864, the Prussian-Austrian armies invaded Schleswig, and ten days afterwards the Danish government requested British help to resist this. Russell urged Palmerston to send a fleet to Copenhagen and persuade Napoleon III that he should mobilise his French soldiers on the borders of Prussia.

Palmerston replied that the fleet could not do much to assist the Danes in Copenhagen and that nothing should be done to persuade Napoleon to cross the Rhine. Britain had a small army and it had no powerful ally to help. Bismarck remarked that the Royal Navy lacked wheels—it was powerless on land where the war would be fought. In April Austria's navy was on its way to attack Copenhagen. Palmerston told the Austrian ambassador that if his fleet entered the Baltic to attack Denmark the result would be war with Britain. The ambassador replied that the Austrian navy would not enter the Baltic and it did not do so.

Palmerston accepted Russell's suggestion that the war should be settled at a conference, but at the ensuing London Conference of 1864 in May and June the Danes refused to accept their loss of Schleswig-Holstein. The armistice ended on 26 June and Prussian-Austrian troops quickly invaded more of Denmark. On 25 June the Cabinet was against going to war to save Denmark, and Russell's suggestion to send the Royal Navy to defend Copenhagen was only carried by Palmerston's vote. Palmerston, however, said the fleet could not be sent in view of the deep division in the Cabinet.

On 27 June, Palmerston gave his statement to the Commons and said Britain would not go to war with the German powers unless the existence of Denmark as an independent power was at stake or Denmark's capital was threatened. The Conservatives replied that Palmerston had betrayed the Danes and a vote of censure in the House of Lords was carried by nine votes. In the debate in the Commons the Conservative MP General Peel said: "It is come to this, that the words of the Prime Minister of England, uttered in the Parliament of England, are to be regarded as mere idle menaces to be laughed at and despised by foreign powers."  Palmerston replied in the last night of the debate: "I say that England stands as high as she ever did and those who say she had fallen in the estimation of the world are not the men to whom the honour and dignity of England should be confided".

The vote of censure was defeated by 313 votes to 295, with Palmerston's old enemies in the pacifist camp, Cobden and Bright, voting for him. The result of the vote was announced at 2:30 in the morning, and when Palmerston heard the news he ran up the stairs to the Ladies' Gallery and embraced his wife. Disraeli wrote: "What pluck to mount those dreadful stairs at three o'clock in the morning, and eighty years of age!"

In a speech at his constituency at Tiverton in August, Palmerston told his constituents:

I am sure every Englishman who has a heart in his breast and a feeling of justice in his mind, sympathizes with those unfortunate Danes (cheers), and wishes that this country could have been able to draw the sword successfully in their defence (continued cheers); but I am satisfied that those who reflect on the season of the year when that war broke out, on the means which this country could have applied for deciding in one sense that issue, I am satisfied that those who make these reflections will think that we acted wisely in not embarking in that dispute. (Cheers.) To have sent a fleet in midwinter to the Baltic every sailor would tell you was an impossibility, but if it could have gone it would have been attended by no effectual result. Ships sailing on the sea cannot stop armies on land, and to have attempted to stop the progress of an army by sending a fleet to the Baltic would have been attempting to do that which it was not possible to accomplish. (Hear, hear.) If England could have sent an army, and although we all know how admirable that army is on the peace establishment, we must acknowledge that we have no means of sending out a force at all equal to cope with the 300,000 or 400,000 men whom the 30,000,000 or 40,000,000 of Germany could have pitted against us, and that such an attempt would only have insured a disgraceful discomfiture—not to the army, indeed, but to the Government which sent out an inferior force and expected it to cope successfully with a force so vastly superior. (Cheers.) ... we did not think that the Danish cause would be considered as sufficiently British, and as sufficiently bearing on the interests and the security and the honour of England, as to make it justifiable to ask the country to make those exertions which such a war would render necessary.

Europe's leaders were unable to settle the matter by peaceful compromise. Palmerston's biographer William Baring Pemberton argued that his "failure to understand Bismarck lies at the root of his misunderstanding of the Schleswig-Holstein question, and it derived from an old man's inability to adapt himself to a changing world". Thus Britain was militarily unable to stop Bismarck's armies and misunderstood Bismarck's ambitions. Russian historian V. N. Vinogradov writes: "In place of the former insight came bias in judgments and stubbornness in defending outdated views. Palmerston continued to consider Prussia 'an instrument in the hands of Austria', its army weak and doomed to defeat, and its public to consist of romantically minded students and dreamy professors. And Otto von Bismarck quietly annexed the two Duchies to Prussia, and at the same time the County of Lauenburg".

Electoral victory
Palmerston won another general election in July 1865, increasing his majority.  The leadership of Palmerston was a great electoral asset to the Liberal Party. He then had to deal with the outbreak of Fenian violence in Ireland. Palmerston ordered the Viceroy of Ireland, Lord Wodehouse, to take measures against this, including a possible suspension of trial-by-jury and a monitoring of Americans travelling to Ireland. He believed that the Fenian agitation was caused by America. On 27 September 1865 he wrote to the Secretary for War:
The American assault on Ireland under the name of Fenianism may be now held to have failed, but the snake is only scotched and not killed. It is far from impossible that the American conspirators may try and obtain in our North American provinces compensation for their defeat in Ireland.

He advised that more armaments be sent to Canada and more troops be sent to Ireland. During these last few weeks of his life, Palmerston pondered on developments in foreign affairs. He began thinking of a new friendship with France as "a sort of preliminary defensive alliance" against the United States and looked forward to Prussia becoming more powerful as this would balance against the growing threat from Russia.  In a letter to Russell he warned that Russia "will in due time become a power almost as great as the old Roman Empire ... Germany ought to be strong in order to resist Russian aggression."

Death
Palmerston enjoyed robust health in old age, living at Romsey in his home Foxhills, built in about 1840. On 12 October 1865, he caught a chill, and instead of retiring immediately to bed he spent an hour and a half dawdling. He then had a violent fever but his condition stabilised for the next few days. However, on the night of 17 October, his health worsened, and when his doctor asked him if he believed in regeneration of the world through Jesus Christ, Palmerston replied: "Oh, surely." His last words were, "That's Article 98; now go on to the next." (He was thinking about diplomatic treaties.) An apocryphal version of his last words is: "Die, my dear doctor? That is the last thing I shall do." He died at 10:45 am on Wednesday, 18 October 1865 two days before his eighty-first birthday. Although Palmerston wanted to be buried at Romsey Abbey, the Cabinet insisted that he should have a state funeral and be buried at Westminster Abbey, which he was, on 27 October 1865. He was the fifth person not of royalty to be granted a state funeral (after Robert Blake, Sir Isaac Newton, Lord Nelson, and the Duke of Wellington).

Queen Victoria wrote after his death that though she regretted his passing, she had never liked or respected him: "Strange, and solemn to think of that strong, determined man, with so much worldly ambition – gone! He had often worried and distressed us, though as Pr. Minister he had behaved very well." Florence Nightingale reacted differently upon hearing of his death: "He will be a great loss to us. Tho' he made a joke when asked to do the right thing, he always did it. No one else will be able to carry things thro' the Cabinet as he did. I shall lose a powerful protector...He was so much more in earnest than he appeared. He did not do himself justice."

Having no male heir, his Irish viscountcy became extinct upon his death, but his property was inherited by his stepson William Cowper-Temple (later created the 1st Baron Mount Temple), whose inheritance included a  estate in the north of County Sligo in the west of Ireland, on which his stepfather had commissioned the building of the incomplete Classiebawn Castle.

Legacy
As the exemplar of British nationalism, he was "the defining political personality of his age."

Historian Norman Gash  endorses Jasper Ridley's characterisation of Palmerston:
Fundamentally he was a professional politician, shrewd, cynical, resilient; tough and sometimes unscrupulous; quick to seize opportunities; always ready either to abandon an impossible cause or bide his time for a more favourable opportunity.  He liked power, he needed his salary, he enjoyed office, he worked hard. In later life he took an increasing pleasure in the game of politics, and ultimately became an adroit and successful prime minister.... in the end he became one of the great Victorian public personalities, a legend in his own lifetime, the personification of an England that was already passing away.

Historian Algernon Cecil summed up his greatness:
 Palmerston placed his trust... in the Press which he was at pains to manipulate; in Parliament, which he learnt better than any man then living to manage; and the Country, whose temper he knew how to catch and the weight of his name and resources he brought to bear upon every negotiation with a patriotic effrontry that has never been excelled.

Palmerston has traditionally been viewed as "a Conservative at home and a Liberal abroad". He believed that the British constitution as secured by the Glorious Revolution of 1688 was the best which human hands had made, with a constitutional monarchy subject to the laws of the land but retaining some political power. He supported the rule of law and opposed further democratisation after the Reform Act 1832. He wished to see this liberal system of a mixed constitution in-between the two extremes of absolute monarchy and republican democracy replace the absolute monarchies on the Continent. More recently some historians have seen his domestic policies as prime minister as not merely liberal but genuinely progressive by the standards of his era.

It is in foreign affairs that Palmerston is chiefly remembered. Palmerston's principal aim in foreign policy was to advance British national interests. Palmerston is famous for his patriotism. Lord John Russell said that "his heart always beat for the honour of England". Palmerston believed it was in Britain's interests that liberal governments be established on the Continent. He also practised brinkmanship and bluff in that he was prepared to threaten war to achieve Britain's interests.

When in 1886 Lord Rosebery became foreign secretary in Gladstone's government, John Bright, a longstanding radical critic of Palmerston, asked Rosebery if he had read about Palmerston's policies as foreign secretary. Rosebery replied that he had. "Then", said Bright, "you know what to avoid. Do the exact opposite of what he did. His administration at the Foreign Office was one long crime."

In contrast the Marquess of Lorne, a son-in-law of Queen Victoria, said of Palmerston in 1866: "He loved his country and his country loved him. He lived for her honour, and she will cherish his memory."

In 1889, Gladstone recounted a story of when "a Frenchman, thinking to be highly complimentary, said to Palmerston: 'If I were not a Frenchman, I should wish to be an Englishman'; to which Pam coolly replied: 'If I were not an Englishman, I should wish to be an Englishman. When Winston Churchill campaigned for rearmament in the 1930s, he was compared to Palmerston in warning the nation to look to its defences. The policy of appeasement led General Jan Smuts to write in 1936 that "we are afraid of our shadows. I sometimes long for a ruffian like Palmerston or any man who would be more than a string of platitudes and apologies."

He was an avowed abolitionist whose attempts to abolish the slave trade was one of the most consistent elements of his foreign policy. His opposition to the slave trade created tensions with South American countries and the United States over his insistence that the Royal Navy had the right to search the vessels of any country if they suspected the vessels were being used in the Atlantic slave trade.

Historian A. J. P. Taylor has summarised his career by emphasising the paradoxes:
For twenty years junior minister in a Tory government, he became the most successful of Whig Foreign Secretaries; though always a Conservative, he ended his life by presiding over the transition from Whiggism to Liberalism. He was the exponent of British strength, yet was driven from office for truckling to a foreign despot; he preached the Balance of Power, yet helped to inaugurate the policy of isolation and of British withdrawal from Europe. Irresponsible and flippant, he became the first hero of the serious middle-class electorate. He reached high office solely through an irregular family connection; he retained it through skilful use of the press—the only Prime Minister to become an accomplished leader-writer.

Palmerston is also remembered for his light-hearted approach to government. He is once said to have claimed of a particularly intractable problem relating to Schleswig-Holstein, that only three people had ever understood the problem: one was Prince Albert, who was dead; the second was a German professor, who had gone insane; and the third was himself, who had forgotten it.

The Life of Lord Palmerston up to 1847 was written by Lord Dalling (Henry Bulwer), volumes I and II (1870), volume III edited and partly written by Evelyn Ashley (1874), after the author's death. Ashley completed the biography in two more volumes (1876). The whole work was reissued in a revised and slightly abridged form by Ashley in 2 volumes in 1879, with the title The Life and Correspondence of Henry John Temple, Viscount Palmerston; the letters are judiciously curtailed, but unfortunately without indicating where the excisions occur; the appendices of the original work are omitted, but much fresh matter is added, and this edition is undoubtedly the standard biography.

The popular Victorian novelist
Anthony Trollope published a very readable memoir of Palmerston, one of his political heroes, in 1882.

Places named after Palmerston

 The Town of Palmerston located in Southwestern Ontario, Canada was founded and named after Palmerston in 1875. Palmerston is now part of the amalgamated town of Minto.
 The former township of Palmerston in Frontenac County in Eastern Ontario, now part of the amalgamated township of North Frontenac
 In New Zealand, the town of Palmerston, in Otago in the South Island, and the city of Palmerston North, in Manawatu in the North Island.
 The Australian city of Darwin was previously named Palmerston in honour of the Viscount. A satellite city called Palmerston was established adjacent to Darwin in 1971.
 Palmerston Atoll is the most northerly of the Southern Group of the Cook Islands in the South Pacific Ocean. Amongst the 15 or so islands of the atoll, Palmerston Island is the only one which is inhabited.
 In the Rathmines area of Dublin 6 in the southern suburbs, villas are named after Palmerston, as well as Temple Road and Palmerston Road. Both are quasi-translated variously as Bóthar an Stiguaire, Bóthar P(h)almerston, Bóthar Baile an Phámar and Bóthar an Teampaill.
 Palmerston Forts
 Several places in Portsmouth are named after Palmerston – notably Southsea's main shopping precinct, Palmerston Road.
 Palmerston Road in East Sheen, London, SW14.
 Palmerston Place in the West End, Edinburgh, EH12.
 Palmerston Road in Walthamstow, London & The Lord Palmerston Pub at the junction of Palmerston Road and Forest Road.
 The Lord Palmerston public house in Dartmouth Park, London, NW5 is named after Palmerston.
 Palmerston Park and the Palmerston Hotel in Tiverton, Devon, Palmerston's constituency, are named after him.
 Palmerston Park, Southampton was named after him, as was nearby Palmerston Road. A seven-foot high marble statue of Palmerston was erected in the park and unveiled on 2 June 1869. Temple street in Sligo is also called after him
 Palmerston Street in Derby.
 Palmerston Street in Bedford.
 Palmerston Road and Palmerston Park in east Belfast.
 Palmerston Boulevard and Palmerston Avenue in Toronto are named for him.
 Palmerston Street in Romsey, Hampshire; there is also a statue of him in the market place.

Cultural references
 Flashman in the Great Game – Early in this historical novel, Palmerston sends Flashman on a mission to India. It happens that the Indian rebellion of 1857 is about to break out.
 1862 – Palmerston is featured in the alternate history novel by Robert Conroy, depicting an American Civil War in which Great Britain allies itself with the Confederacy after the Trent Affair at the direction of Palmerston.
 Stars and Stripes trilogy – Palmerston is featured in the alternate history novel by Harry Harrison, depicting an American Civil War in which Great Britain invades both the United States and the Confederacy after the Trent Affair.
 Flying Colours – in this novel by CS Forester, Horatio Hornblower meets a young Palmerston on returning to England.
 Wagons West! - Palmerston is portrayed early in the book series in opposition to American settlement of Oregon Country.
 The Simpsons - in "Homer at the Bat", Barney Gumble argues with Wade Boggs that Palmerston was the greatest prime minister, with Boggs arguing for Pitt the Elder.
 Palmerston, the resident Chief Mouser of the Foreign & Commonwealth Office since 13 April 2016, was named after Palmerston.
 Laurence Fox portrays Palmerston in series 3 of Victoria (2019); the series dramatises his turbulent period as foreign secretary.

Palmerston's First Cabinet, February 1855 – February 1858

 Lord Palmerston – First Lord of the Treasury and Leader of the House of Commons
 Lord Cranworth – Lord Chancellor
 Lord Granville – Lord President of the Council and Leader of the House of Lords
 The Duke of Argyll – Lord Privy Seal
 Sir George Grey – Secretary of State for the Home Department
 Lord Clarendon – Secretary of State for Foreign Affairs
 Sidney Herbert – Secretary of State for the Colonies
 Lord Panmure – Secretary of State for War
 Sir James Graham – First Lord of the Admiralty
 William Ewart Gladstone – Chancellor of the Exchequer
 Sir Charles Wood – President of the Board of Control
 Lord Stanley of Alderley – President of the Board of Trade
 Lord Harrowby – Chancellor of the Duchy of Lancaster
 Sir William Molesworth, 8th Baronet – First Commissioner of Works
 Lord Canning – Postmaster-General
 Lord Lansdowne – Minister without Portfolio

Changes
 Later in February 1855 – Sir George Cornewall Lewis succeeds Gladstone as Chancellor of the Exchequer. Lord John Russell succeeds Herbert as Colonial Secretary. Sir Charles Wood succeeds Sir James Graham as First Lord of the Admiralty. R.V. Smith succeeds Wood as President of the Board of Control
 July 1855 – Sir William Molesworth succeeds Russell as Colonial Secretary. Molesworth's successor as First Commissioner of Public Works is not in the Cabinet.
 November 1855 – Henry Labouchere succeeds Molesworth as Colonial Secretary
 December 1855 – The Duke of Argyll succeeds Lord Canning as Postmaster-General. Lord Harrowby succeeds Argyll as Lord Privy Seal. Harrowby's successor as Chancellor of the Duchy of Lancaster is not in the Cabinet
 1857 – M.T. Baines, the Chancellor of the Duchy of Lancaster, enters the Cabinet.
 February 1858 – Lord Clanricarde succeeds Harrowby as Lord Privy Seal.

Palmerston's Second Cabinet, June 1859 – October 1865

 Lord Palmerston – First Lord of the Treasury and Leader of the House of Commons
 Lord Campbell – Lord Chancellor
 Lord Granville – Lord President of the Council and Leader of the House of Lords
 The Duke of Argyll – Lord Privy Seal
 Sir George Cornewall Lewis – Secretary of State for the Home Department
 Lord John Russell – Secretary of State for Foreign Affairs
 The Duke of Newcastle – Secretary of State for the Colonies
 Sidney Herbert – Secretary of State for War
 Sir Charles Wood – Secretary of State for India
 The Duke of Somerset – First Lord of the Admiralty
 William Ewart Gladstone – Chancellor of the Exchequer
 Edward Cardwell – Chief Secretary for Ireland
 Thomas Milner Gibson – President of the Board of Trade and of the Poor Law Board
 Sir George Grey – Chancellor of the Duchy of Lancaster
 Lord Elgin – Postmaster-General

Changes
 July 1859 – Charles Pelham Villiers succeeds Milner-Gibson as President of the Poor Law Board (Milner-Gibson remains at the Board of Trade)
 May 1860 – Lord Stanley of Alderley succeeds Lord Elgin as Postmaster-General
 June 1861 – Lord Westbury succeeds Lord Campbell as Lord Chancellor
 July 1861 – Sir George Cornewall Lewis succeeds Herbert as Secretary for War.  Sir George Grey succeeds Lewis as Home Secretary.  Edward Cardwell succeeds Grey as Chancellor of the Duchy of Lancaster.  Cardwell's successor as Chief Secretary for Ireland is not in the Cabinet.
 April 1863 – Lord de Grey becomes Secretary for War following Sir George Lewis's death.
 April 1864 – Edward Cardwell succeeds the Duke of Newcastle as Colonial Secretary. Lord Clarendon succeeds Cardwell as Chancellor of the Duchy of Lancaster.
 July 1865 – Lord Cranworth succeeds Lord Westbury as Lord Chancellor

Arms

See also
 History of the foreign relations of the United Kingdom
 Foreign policy of William Ewart Gladstone
 International relations (1814–1919)
 Timeline of British diplomatic history

References

Bibliography

 Bell, H.C.F. Lord Palmerston (2 vol 1936)  vol 1 online; also vol 2 online
 Bell, Herbert C. "Palmerston and Parliamentary Representation." Journal of Modern History 4.2 (1932): 186–213. 
 Bailey, Frank E. "The Economics of British Foreign Policy, 1825-50." Journal of Modern History 12.4 (1940): 449–484. online
 
 
 Brown, David. "Lord Palmerston" Historian (Winter 2002) 76:33–35; historiography
 
 
 Brown, David. "Palmerston and Anglo–French Relations, 1846–1865." Diplomacy and Statecraft 17.4 (2006): 675–692.
 
 
 Brown, David and Miles Taylor, eds. Palmerston Studies I and II (Southampton: Harrley Institute, 2007); pp. 203, 207; essays by scholars
 Cecil, Algernon. British Foreign Secretaries 1807-1916 (1927) pp. 131–226. online
 Chamberlain, Muriel Evelyn. British foreign policy in the age of Palmerston (Longman, 1980).
 Chambers, James. Palmerston. 'The People's Darling''' (John Murray, 2004).
 
   excerpt
 Friedman, Isaiah. "Lord Palmerston and the protection of Jews in Palestine 1839-1851." Jewish Social Studies (1968): 23–41. 
  Excerpt
 Golicz, Roman. "Napoleon III, Lord Palmerston and the Entente Cordiale." History Today 50.12 (2000): 10–17.
 Henderson, Gavin B. "The Foreign Policy of Lord Palmerston" History 22#88 (1938), pp. 335–344, 
 
 Hickson, G. F. "Palmerston and the Clayton-Bulwer Treaty". Cambridge Historical Journal 3#3 (1931), pp. 295–303. 
 , wide-ranging scholarly survey
 Kingston, Klari. "Gunboat Liberalism? Palmerston, Europe and 1848" History Today 47#2 (1997) 37–43.
 Leonard, Dick Nineteenth Century British Premieres: Pitt to Roseberry (2008) pp. 245–65.
 Macknight, Thomas. Thirty Years of Foreign Policy, a History of the Secretaryships of the Earl of Aberdeen and Viscount Palmerston (1855), Online free
  Online free
 Paul, Herbert. History of Modern England, 1904-6 (5 vols)  vol 2 online 1855–1865
 Judd, Denis. Palmerston (Bloomsbury, 2015).
 Morse, Hosea Ballou. International Relations of the Chinese Empire: The  Period of Conflict: 1834-1860. (1910) online 
 ; Online free to borrow 
 Roberts, David. "Lord Palmerston at the home office." Historian 21.1 (1958): 63-81. 
 Rodkey, Frederick Stanley. "Lord Palmerston and the rejuvenation of Turkey, 1830-41." Journal of Modern History 1.4 (1929): 570-593. online
 Rodkey, Frederick Stanley. "Lord Palmerston and the Rejuvenation of Turkey, 1830-41: Part II, 1839-41." Journal of Modern History 2.2 (1930): 193-225. 
 Seton-Watson, R. W. Britain in Europe, 1789–1914: A survey of foreign policy (1937) pp. 241–300, 400–63. online
 
 Steele, E.D. Palmerston and Liberalism, 1855–1865 (1991)
 
 Steele, David. "Three British Prime Ministers and the Survival of the Ottoman Empire, 1855–1902." Middle Eastern Studies 50.1 (2014): 43-60. Covers Palmerston, Gladstone, and Salisbury.
 Taylor, A. J. P. "Lord Palmerston" History Today (July 1951) 1#7 pp. 35–41 online
 Taylor, Antony. "Palmerston and Radicalism, 1847-1865." Journal of British Studies 33.2 (1994): 157-179. 
 Temperley, Harold, and Gavin B. Henderson. "Disraeli and Palmerston in 1857, or, the Dangers of Explanations in Parliament." Cambridge Historical Journal 7.2 (1942): 115-126. 
 Vereté, Mayir. "Palmerston and the Levant Crisis, 1832." Journal of Modern History 24.2 (1952): 143-151. 
 Weber, Frank G. "Palmerston and Prussian Liberalism, 1848." Journal of Modern History 35.2 (1963): 125-136. 
  Webster, Charles. The Foreign Policy of Palmerston. 1830-1841 (2v. 1951) a major study
 Weigall, David. Britain and the World, 1815–1986: A Dictionary of International relations (1989)
 Ward, A.W. and G. P. Gooch, eds. The Cambridge History of British Foreign Policy, 1783–1919 (3 vol, 1921–23), Volume II: 1815–66 Williams, Chris, ed. A Companion to 19th-Century Britain (2006). Chapters 1 to 4, pp. 15–92;
 

Primary sources

 . 
 Bourne, Kenneth, ed/  Foreign Policy of Victorian England, 1830-1902 (1970) Long introduction, +147 primary source documents, many by Palmerston.
 
 
 Lord, Sudley ed. The Lieven Palmerston Correspondence 1828-1856 (1943) online
 Partridge, Michael, and Richard Gaunt. Lives of Victorian Political Figures Part 1: Palmerston, Disraeli and Gladstone (4 vol. Pickering & Chatto. 2006) reprints 19 original pamphlets on Palmerston.
 Temperley, Harold and L.M. Penson, eds. Foundations of British Foreign Policy: From Pitt (1792) to Salisbury (1902)'' (1938), primary sources pp. 88–304 online

External links

 
 Viscount Palmerston 1784–1865 biography from the Liberal Democrat History Group
 More about Viscount Palmerston on the Downing Street website.
 
 
 Papers of Henry John Temple, third Viscount Palmerston. University of Southampton.
 
Edward J. Davies, "The Ancestry of Lord Palmerston", The Genealogist, 22(2008):62–77

Offices and titles

1784 births
1865 deaths
19th-century prime ministers of the United Kingdom
Prime Ministers of the United Kingdom
People of the Victorian era
Leaders of the Liberal Party (UK)
British Secretaries of State for Foreign Affairs
Secretaries of State for the Home Department
Lords of the Admiralty
Temple, Henry John
Temple, Henry
Temple, Henry John
Temple, Henry John
Temple, Henry John
Temple, Henry John
Temple, Henry John
Temple, Henry John
Temple, Henry John
Temple, Henry John
Temple, Henry John
Temple, Henry John
Temple, Henry John
Temple, Henry John
Temple, Henry John
Temple, Henry John
Temple, Henry John
UK MPs who inherited peerages
Temple, Henry John
Temple, Henry
Members of the Parliament of the United Kingdom for Tiverton
Lords Warden of the Cinque Ports
Members of the Privy Council of the United Kingdom
Alumni of the University of Edinburgh
Alumni of St John's College, Cambridge
Rectors of the University of Glasgow
People educated at Harrow School
Knights of the Garter
Knights Grand Cross of the Order of the Bath
People from Westminster
Burials at Westminster Abbey
Leaders of the House of Commons of the United Kingdom
Fellows of the Royal Society
Liberal Party prime ministers of the United Kingdom
War Office
Viscounts Palmerston